Mahila Money is a financial services platform for women. The digital platform provides micro loans to women entrepreneurs to help with business set-up, business growth and employment opportunities. It focuses on supporting entrepreneurship as well as the financial literacy of women.

History
In September 2021, Sairee Chahal founded Mahila Money along with its two co-founders, Siddhika Agarwal and Vaibhav Kathju.

Sairee is a technology entrepreneur who created SHEROES, which acts as a social networking site for helping women grow using the internet as a tool.

Financial aid
Women entrepreneurs with no access to microfinance can gain finances via Mahila Money. Once approved, applicants are served with micro-loans ranging from Rs. 10,000 to Rs. 2,00,000. Unapproved applicants can become part of the Mahila Money community where they get to learn how to improve their eligibility and financial mark.

Partnerships
Mahila Money has partnered with VISA to launch the Mahila Money Prepaid Card. This card is powered by Transcorp. It aims to help small business owners, digital entrepreneurs and women make digital transactions more effectively.

References

External links
 

Payment systems
Credit cards